Lev Gleason Publications, founded by Leverett Stone Gleason (1898–1971), was the publisher of a number of popular comic books during the 1940s and early 1950s, including Daredevil Comics, Crime Does Not Pay, and Boy Comics.

Background
Lev Gleason Publications, founded by Leverett Gleason in 1939, was based in Manhattan, New York City, and was among the first to produce comic books aimed at an adult audience. He labeled some of his books "illustories" to suggest that they were a new, different form.

Gleason began his career in 1931 as an artist and advertising director for Open Road for Boys magazine. from 1932 to circa 1934, he served as advertising manager under Harry Wildenberg at Eastern Color Printing, a printer that became a comics-publishing pioneer in 1933 with the first American comic books. Becoming an editor at the newspaper syndicate United Feature, Gleason in 1936 launched the early comic book Tip Top Comics, which ran through 1938. He later became business manager at publisher Dan Gilmor's company Your Guide Publications, Inc., which was affiliated with Gilmor's Friday, Inc. and New Friday, Inc.

Gleason, the treasurer of New Friday, purchased the comic-book series Silver Streak Comics and Daredevil Comics (no relation to the Marvel Comics character Daredevil) from that company circa 1942. Under the imprint Comic House Inc., Gleason continued the numbering of  Silver Streak Comics with a crime comic, Crime Does Not Pay, which premiered with issue #22 (cover-dated July 1942). Also that year, Gleason briefly published the left-wing political magazine Reader's Choice.

The first and most successful crime comic, Crime Does Not Pay spawned dozens of imitators. Gleason's crime titles (along with horror titles produced by EC Comics) became targets of increasing criticism of the influence of comic books. This pressure led to the formation in 1948 of the Association of Comics Magazine Publishers (ACMP) in an effort to avoid external regulation. Gleason was a founding member. The ACMP was the first step toward the establishment of the Comics Code Authority in 1954.

In April 1949, Lev Gleason Publications — at this point located ar 114 East 32nd Street in Manhattan — began publishing a comics magazine for adults, Tops, carrying "stories illustrated in the style and technique of comic strips." The first-issue features included an excerpt from the Billy Rose book Wine, Women and Words.

Gleason went out of business in 1956. Its final publications were the teen-humor comic Jim Dandy #3 (Sept. 1956), and the children's Western comedy Shorty Shiner #3 (Oct. 1956). Both were published under the imprint Dandy Magazines Inc., as A Dandy Comic.

Personnel 
Beginning December 15, 1947, Lev Gleason Publications' advertising director was Gilbert G. Southwick, who had resigned as food advertising manager for Seventeen magazine. He left in September the following year to become vice president and general manager of the Roselle Park, New Jersey, toy manufacturer Childhood Interests, Inc. In 1953, Gleason vice president E.A. Piller resigned to open his own office as a publishers' representative, with Gleason among his clients.

Selected list of Lev Gleason Publications titles 
 Black Diamond Western (1949–1956) 52 issues
 Boy Comics (1942–1956) 117 issues
 Boy Loves Girl (1952–1956) 33 issues
 Boy Meets Girl (1950–1952) 24 issues
 Crime and Punishment (1948–1955) 74 issues
 Crime Does Not Pay (1942–1955) 126 issues
 Daredevil Comics (1941–1956) 134 issues
 Lovers' Lane (1949–1954) 41 issues
 Silver Streak Comics (1939–1946) 23 issues

References

External links
 
 
 Lev Gleason's Comic House
 Kent Worcester’s book review for The Comics Journal (15 July 2020) of Brett Dakin’s “American Daredevil: Comics, Communism, and The Battles of Lev Gleason”

Comic book publishing companies of the United States
Defunct comics and manga publishing companies
Crime comics